Frank Joseph Fertitta III (February 24, 1962) is an American businessman. He is the CEO of Station Casinos. He is also a founder of Zuffa LLC, formerly the parent entity of the Ultimate Fighting Championship (UFC).

Education
Born to Frank Fertitta Jr. and Victoria (née Broussard) Fertitta, Frank III attended Bishop Gorman High School in Las Vegas, Nevada. 
In 1984, he graduated from the University of Southern California, where he earned a BA/BS degree from the business school.

Career
History with Station Casinos:
1985: Officer/General Manager
1986: Director, Executive Vice President and Chief Operating Officer
1989 – July 2000: President
July 1992 – present: Chief Executive Officer

Philanthropy
On October 18, 2012, the University of Southern California announced that Jill and Frank Fertitta had made a major gift to the university which would result in the construction of a new building for the USC Marshall School of Business and the establishment of the Jill and Frank Fertitta Endowed Chair in Business.

Personal life
Fertitta resides in Las Vegas with his wife Jill and three children.

He is third-cousin to fellow businessman Tilman Fertitta. Frank and his wife are major donors to the Republican Party and Republican candidates, having given more than $9,800,000 from 2009 to 2020, making him, along with his brother, one of the largest contributors in Nevada.

Fertitta is among plaintiffs against Knoedler Gallery LLC for having sold to him a forged Mark Rothko painting.

References

External links
 

1962 births
Living people
American billionaires
American casino industry businesspeople
American chief executives of travel and tourism industry companies
American chief operating officers
American people of Italian descent
Bishop Gorman High School alumni
Marshall School of Business alumni
Mixed martial arts people
People from Las Vegas